Raifler is an alternative name to several wine grape varieties including:

Green Hungarian
Roter Veltliner
Zierfandler